Chris Kringel is an American bass player. He is the author of several instructional books for the bass guitar. He was born in Appleton, Wisconsin and lives in Milwaukee. In 1995, recorded Demos with the post-breakup Cynic band Portal. After a while, he was also involved in another Cynic-linked project, Æon Spoke, recording Demos2000. Playing live with Cynic when they reunited in 2007, as band's original bassist Sean Malone was unavailable for touring, Masvidal called Kringel and he performed on a number of world-wide shows from the 2007 Cynic Reunion Tour. He currently produces several Play A-Long series for Hal Leonard Publishing, does production and recording for several artists and performs in the Milwaukee area.

Books authored
Fretless Bass (Hal Leonard, 2007)
Funk Bass (Hal Leonard, 2004)
Play Bass Today! Songbook (Hal Leonard, 2001)
The Bassist's Guide To Creativity (Hal Leonard, 2010)
Essential Bass Guitar Techniques" (Hal Leonard, 2013)Play Bass Today! - Level 1 (Hal Leonard, 2000)Play Bass Today! - Level 2 (Hal Leonard, 2001)100 Blues Lesson (Hal Leonard, 2014)100 Funk/R&B Lessons(Hal Leonard, 2014)

Discography
 Portal - Demo (1995)
 Æon Spoke - Above The Buried Cry (2007)
 Fibonacci Sequence - Numerology (2010)
 Fibonacci Sequence - We Three Kings (2010)
 Inda Eaton - Why The Desert (2000)
 Chris Kringel/Del Bennett - I Said'' (2009)

References

External links 
Official site

American heavy metal bass guitarists
Living people
Year of birth missing (living people)
Writers from Appleton, Wisconsin
Guitarists from Wisconsin
Progressive metal bass guitarists
American male bass guitarists
Æon Spoke members
Cynic (band) members